A post office is a facility that is part of a postal network.

Post Office may also refer to several national postal services, including:

 General Post Office, the former English and British postal service
 Post Office Limited, retail post office company in the United Kingdom
 United States Post Office Department, the former U.S. postal service
 United States Postal Service, the present U.S. postal service
 Canada Post, the present Canadian postal service

It may also refer to:

 St Paul's tube station, originally known as Post Office from its position near the GPO East
 Post office (game), a kissing game played by boys and girls
 The Post Office (play), a 1912 play by Rabindranath Tagore
 Post Office (short story), a 1923 short story by Dhumketu
 Post Office (novel), a 1971 novel by Charles Bukowski
 "Post Office" (2 Stupid Dogs), an episode of 2 Stupid Dogs

See also

 Postal service (disambiguation)
 General Post Office (disambiguation)
 Central Post Office (disambiguation)
 Old Post Office (disambiguation)
 Post (disambiguation)